Chidiac is a surname. Notable people with the surname include: 

Alex Chidiac (born 1999), Australian soccer player
Antoine Chidiac (born 1952), Lebanese judoka
Daniel Chidiac, Australian writer
Jorge Estefan Chidiac (born 1963), Mexican politician
May Chidiac (born 1963), Lebanese journalist and politician